"We Are Detective" is a 1983 song by British pop band Thompson Twins. It was the third single from the band's third studio album, Quick Step & Side Kick (1983). 

It was the band's second single to reach the UK Top Ten, peaking at no. 7. It also reached no. 48 in Alannah Currie's native New Zealand A limited number of copies of the 12" single came with a free 12" of the tracks "Love Lies Fierce" and "Frozen in Time", both remixes of the songs "Love Lies Bleeding" and "Kamikaze" from the album.

Track listing
 12" Single (ARIST 12 526, ARIST 12526)
"We Are Detective (More Clues)" – 6:00
"Lucky Day (Space Mix)" – 6:58

 7" Single (ARIST 526)
"We Are Detective" – 3:05
"Lucky Day" – 3:52

Official versions
 Album Version – 3:05
 Extended Version – 6:00

Sales chart performance

Weekly charts

See also
1983 in British music
Thompson Twins discography

References

External links

1983 singles
Thompson Twins songs
Songs written by Tom Bailey (musician)
Songs written by Alannah Currie
1983 songs
Songs written by Joe Leeway
Arista Records singles